Lokvica is a settlement in the Municipality of Miren-Kostanjevica in the Littoral region of Slovenia next to the border with Italy.

References

External links
Lokvica on Geopedia

Populated places in the Municipality of Miren-Kostanjevica